The 1310s in music involved some events.

Events 
 1310 – Completion of the first book of the short version of the Roman de Fauvel, possibly by Gervès du Bus, who later would write the second book.
 1313 – Augsburg Cathedral receives a bequest from the bishop to promote choral singing.
 1314
 6 December – Gervès du Bus completes of the second book of the Roman de Fauvel.
 1316 – A "Mistro Zucchetto" is appointed organist at St Mark’s, Venice, in the earliest document related to music at that church.
 1317 – Chaillou de Pesstain expands the Roman de Fauvel.
 1318 – 
 In the week before Laetare Sunday in Lent, the annual assembly ("school") of minstrels is held in Bruges.
 exact date unknown – Deacon Niphon of Grottaferrata copies MS V-CVbav gr.1562 with hymns in the eight modes (oktōēchos) for Sundays.

Compositions 
 1314 – Philippe de Vitry, Garrit gallus/In nova fert/Neuma (motet, for three voices)

Births

Deaths
 1318
 29 November – Frauenlob (Heinrich von Meissen), minnesinger.
 1319
 exact date unknown – Remigio dei Girolami, Italian philosopher and music theorist.

References

14th century in music
Music